Sphaerodinus is a genus of beetles in the family Carabidae, containing the following species:

 Sphaerodinus goudoti Jeannel, 1949
 Sphaerodinus pauliani Basilewsky, 1977

References

Licininae